Ukiah Oregon is the hero of an eponymous series of science fiction adventure novels written by Wen Spencer.

The Ukiah Oregon series consists of four novels:
Alien Taste (2001) Winner of the Compton Crook Award
Tainted Trail (2002)
Bitter Waters (2003)
Dog Warrior (October 2004)
The four novels form a near-continuous series of adventures located, with flashbacks, between June and September 2004.

Ukiah Oregon is a Native American Pittsburgh-based private investigator who has a photographic memory. He also has a remarkable ability to track people and sense the details of a subject's DNA.

Characters
Ukiah Oregon is the main character of the series, a Pittsburgh-based private investigator. He was raised by wolves near the town of Ukiah, Oregon (where he gets his name) until Mom Jo caught him in a humane trap and took him home to Pittsburgh, Pennsylvania. He discovers that he is a half-alien "breeder" discovered to help the Ontongard invade Earth. Later, he learns that he was a part of the original breeder named Magic Boy, who was murdered and dismembered in 1933.

Max Bennett is Ukiah's partner. A millionaire, Max became an investigator specializing in finding missing persons after his wife disappeared.

Indigo Zheng is an FBI agent and Ukiah's girlfriend.

Prime was one of the alien Ontongard, but because of a mutation, he was not part of the hive mind.

Coyote, as Prime's Get, continued the war against the Ontongard, eventually taking human shape. 

Rennie Shaw was Coyote's first Get, and is the leader of the Pack as a whole, and the Dog Warriors in particular. He was a soldier in the Civil War, and Coyote discovered him trapped under a horse and dying.

Hex is the Ontongard on Earth.

Kittaning is Ukiah's son.

Samual Anne Killington is a Pendleton, Oregon-based private investigator whom Ukiah and Max meet while investigating the disappearance of Alicia Kraynak.

Mom Jo and Mom Lara are Ukiah's adoptive lesbian mothers. They also have a daughter named Callie.

Raymond Kraynak, a homicide detective and a friend of Max's from the Gulf War.

Magic Boy was the original breeder created by Prime. 

Jesse Kicking Deer is an old man by the time Ukiah meets him.

Zoey Kicking Deer, Ukiah's young (and distant) cousin, is the first to believe he is Magic Boy.

Jared Kicking Deer is the sheriff of Pendleton and Zoe's older brother.

Cassidy Kicking Deer is Ukiah's distant cousin and the owner of a hardware store. 

Atticus Steele is Ukiah's brother.

Hikaru Takahashi is Atticus's partner and lover.

Kyle Johnson is the third member of Atticus's team.

Series of books
Oregon, Ukiah